Zuclomifene (INN; or zuclomiphene (USAN)) is a nonsteroidal selective estrogen receptor modulator (SERM) of the triphenylethylene group that was never marketed. It is one of the two stereoisomers of clomifene, which itself is a mixture of 38% zuclomifene and 62% enclomifene. Zuclomifene is the (Z)-stereoisomer of clomifene, while enclomifene is the (E)-stereoisomer. Whereas zuclomifene is described as mildly estrogenic, enclomifene is described as antiestrogenic. In accordance, unlike enclomifene, zuclomifene is antigonadotropic due to activation of the estrogen receptor and reduces testosterone levels in men. It is also about five times more potent than enclomifene in inducing ovulation.

References

Organochlorides
Phenol ethers
Selective estrogen receptor modulators
Triphenylethylenes
Abandoned drugs
Diethylamino compounds